Badosa is a Spanish surname. Notable people with the surname include: 

 (1927–2021), Spanish writer and translator
Jordi Torras Badosa (born 1980), Spanish futsal player
Paula Badosa (born 1997), Spanish  tennis player

Spanish-language surnames